Vagus nerve stimulation (VNS) is a medical treatment that involves delivering electrical impulses to the vagus nerve. It is used as an add-on treatment for certain types of intractable epilepsy and treatment-resistant depression.

Medical use
VNS devices are used to treat drug-resistant epilepsy and treatment-resistant major depressive disorder (TR-MDD). 

In the United States, VNS is approved as adjunctive therapy for those 4 years of age or older with refractory focal onset seizures. In the European Union, VNS is approved as an adjunctive therapy for patients with either generalized or focal onset seizures without any age restrictions. It is recommended that VNS is only pursued following an adequate trial of at least 2 appropriately chosen anti-seizure medications and that the patient is ineligible for epilepsy surgery. This is because epilepsy surgery is associated with a higher probability of resulting in seizure freedom. Patients who have poor adherence or tolerance of anti-seizure medications may be good candidates for VNS. Patients with comorbid depression have been found to have mood improvements with VNS therapy.

VNS may provide benefit for particular epilepsy syndromes and seizure types such as Lennox-Gastaut syndrome, tuberous sclerosis complex related epilepsy, refractory absence seizures and atonic seizures. There are also reports of VNS being successfully utilized in patients with refractory and super-refractory status epilepticus.

Efficacy

Epilepsy 
A meta-analysis of 74 clinical studies with 3321 patients found that VNS produced an average 51% reduction in seizures after 1 year of therapy. Approximately 50% of patients had an equal to or greater than 50% reduction in seizures at the time of last follow-up. Long term studies have shown that response to VNS increases over time. For instance, a study that followed 74 patients for 10-17 years found a seizure frequency reduction of 50-90% in 38.4%, 51.4%, 63.6% and 77.8% of patients at 1-, 2-, 10- and 17-years following implantation, respectively. Approximately, 8% have total resolution of seizures. VNS has also been shown to reduce rates of sudden unexpected death in epilepsy (SUDEP) and to improve quality of life metrics. A number of predictors of a favorable clinical response have been identified including epilepsy onset > 12 years of age, generalized epilepsy type, non-lesional epilepsy, posttraumatic epilepsy and those who have less than a 10 year history of seizures.

Depression 
As of 2017, the efficacy of VNS for TR-MDD is unclear. A 2022 narrative review concluded that "The use of VNS is an approved, effective and well-tolerated long-term therapy for chronic and treatment-resistant depression. Further sham-controlled studies over a longer observational period are desirable".

Mechanism of action 
The vagus nerve is the tenth cranial nerve and arises from a series of rootlets in the medulla; it carries both afferent (80%) and efferent (20%) fibers. It has the longest and widest distribution of all the cranial nerves and functions as a bidirectional link between the brain and peripheral organs. Afferents from the vagus nerve project to the nucleus tractus solitarius which subsequently communicates with other regions of the brain including the dorsal raphe nucleus, locus coeruleus, amygdala and other areas.

There are multiple potential mechanisms which may account for the efficacy of VNS in treating epilepsy and other conditions including:

1.   There is evidence that VNS results in cortical desynchronization in epilepsy patients who had a favorable clinical response relative to those who did not. This makes sense given that seizures consist of abnormal hypersynchronous activity in the brain.

2.   Multiple lines of evidence suggest that inflammation plays a significant role in epilepsy as well as associated neurobehavioral comorbidities such as depression, autism spectrum disorder and cognitive impairment. There is evidence that VNS has an anti-inflammatory effect through both peripheral and central mechanisms.

3.   VNS can change the activity of several neurotransmitter systems involving serotonin, norepinephrine and GABA. These neurotransmitters are involved in both epilepsy and other neuropsychiatric conditions such as depression and anxiety.

4.   VNS may alter the functional connectivity in several brain regions and enhance synaptic plasticity to reduce excitatory activity involved in seizures. It has also been shown to change the functional connectivity of the default mode network in depressed patients.

Adverse events 
There are two categories of adverse events associated with VNS: (1) those related to the surgical procedure and (2) those related to stimulation. A large 25-year retrospective study of 247 patients found a surgical complication rate of 8.6%. The common adverse events included infection in 2.6%, hematoma at the surgical site in 1.9% and vocal cord palsy in 1.4%. The most common stimulation related side effect at 1 year following implantation are hoarseness in 28% and paraesthesias in the throat-chin region in 12%. At the third year the rate of stimulation related adverse effects decreased substantially with shortness of breath being the most common and occurring in 3.2%. In general, VNS is well tolerated and side effects diminish over time. Also, side effects can be controlled by changing the stimulation parameters.

There is evidence that VNS can induce sleep apnea in as many as 28% of adult patients.

Devices and procedures
The device consists of a generator the size of a matchbox that is implanted under the skin below the person’s collarbone. Lead wires from the generator are tunnelled up to the patient’s neck and wrapped around the left vagus nerve at the carotid sheath, where it delivers electrical impulses to the nerve.

Implantation of the VNS device is usually done as an out-patient procedure. The procedure goes as follows: an incision is made in the upper left chest and the generator is implanted into a little "pouch" on the left chest under the collarbone. A second incision is made in the neck, so that the surgeon can access the vagus nerve. The surgeon then wraps the leads around the left branch of the vagus nerve, and connects the electrodes to the generator. Once successfully implanted, the generator sends electric impulses to the vagus nerve at regular intervals.  The left vagus nerve is stimulated rather than the right because the right plays a role in cardiac function such that stimulating it could have negative cardiac effects.  The "dose" administered by the device then needs to be set, which is done via a magnetic wand; the parameters adjusted include current, frequency, pulse width, and duty cycle.

"Wearable" devices are being tested and developed that involve transcutaneous stimulation and do not require surgery. Electrical impulses are targeted at the aurical (ear), at points where branches of the vagus nerve have cutaneous representation; such devices had been tested in clinical trials for treatment resistant major depressive disorder as of 2017.

History

Early History 
James L. Corning (1855-1923) was an American neurologist who developed the first device for stimulating the vagus nerve towards the end of the 19th century. At that time a widely held theory was that excessive blood flow caused seizures. In the 1880s Corning designed a pronged instrument called the “carotid fork” to compress the carotid artery for the acute treatment of seizures. In addition, he developed the “carotid truss” for prolonged compression of the carotid arteries as a long-term preventative treatment for epilepsy. Then he developed the “electrocompressor” which allowed for the compression of the bilateral carotid arteries as well as electrical stimulation of both the vagus and cervical sympathetic nerves. The idea was to reduce cardiac output and to stimulate cervical sympathetic nerves to constrict cerebral blood vessels. Corning reported dramatic benefits however it was not accepted by his colleagues and ultimately was forgotten.

In the 1930s Biley and Bremer demonstrated the direct influence of VNS on the central nervous system. This was in contrary to Corning who had intended to use it to reduce cerebral blood flow. In the 1940s and 1950s vagal nerve stimulation was shown to affect EEG activity. Finally, nearly 100 years since Corning, Zabara proposed that VNS could be used to treat epilepsy. He then demonstrated its efficacy in animal experiments. The first human was implanted with a VNS for the treatment of epilepsy in 1988.

Later History 
In 1997, the US Food and Drug Administration's neurological devices panel met to consider approval of an implanted vagus nerve stimulator (VNS) for epilepsy, requested by Cyberonics (which was subsequently acquired by LivaNova).

The FDA approved an implanted VNS for TR-MDD in 2005.

In April 2017, the FDA cleared marketing of a handheld noninvasive vagus nerve stimulator, called "gammaCore" and made by ElectroCore LLC, for episodic cluster headaches, under the de novo pathway.  In January 2018, the FDA cleared a new use of that device, for the treatment of migraine pain in adults under a 510(k) based on the de novo clearance.

In 2020, electroCore's non-invasive VNS was granted an Emergency Use Authorization for treating COVID-19 patients, given Research has shown this pulse train causes airways in the lungs to open its anti-inflammatory effect.

Research 
Because the vagus nerve is associated with many different functions and brain regions, clinical research has been done to determine its usefulness in treating other illnesses, including various anxiety disorders, obesity, alcohol addiction, chronic heart failure, prevention of arrhythmias that can cause sudden cardiac death, autoimmune disorders, irritable bowel syndrome, Alzheimer's disease, Parkinson's disease, hypertension, and several chronic pain conditions. A recent study showed that chronic VNS showed strong antidepressant and anxiolytic effects, and improved memory performance in an Alzheimer's Disease animal model. 

tVNS has also been shown to enhance memory in healthy adults.

VNS has also been studied in small trials of people with neurodevelopmental disorders, generally who also have had epilepsy, including Landau-Kleffner syndrome, Rett syndrome, and autism spectrum disorders. VNS is being studied as of 2018 as a treatment for migraines and fibromyalgia.

Transcutaneous
As of 2015, VNS devices were being developed that were not implanted, but rather transmitted signals through the skin, known as transcutaneous vagus nerve stimulation (tVNS). Electrical impulses are targeted at the auricle of the ear at points where branches of the vagus nerve are close to the surface. It is non-invasive and based on the rationale that there is vagus nerve distribution on the surface of the ear. tVNS is being studied for stroke and the treatment of depression.

See also

References

Further reading 

 
 

Electrotherapy
Implants (medicine)
Neurology procedures
Neuroprosthetics
Neurotechnology
Surgery